(October 29, 1965 – September 12, 1995) was a motorcycle road racer, born in Koshigaya, Japan.

Career 
Nagai raced in Japan's All-Japan Road Racing Championship for many years, spending seven of them with Yamaha Motor Company. He was also a member of the 1994 Bol d'Or winning Yamaha France team, with Dominique and Christian Sarron.

Nagai took two pole positions in the Superbike World Championship. He was the first Japanese racer to take a Championship pole outside Japan (in Austria in ). He achieved four podium finishes.

Accident and death 
Nagai died two days after crashing at Assen, Netherlands during the 1995 Superbike World Championship race. Riding a Yamaha YZF750, he rode over oil spilled on the track by a Ducati 916. As he fell, his Yamaha landed on top of him. Nagai's injuries left him in a coma from which he never regained consciousness. Nagai died in a nearby hospital at the age of 29. Despite not taking part in the final two rounds, he was 5th overall in the  standings.

References

Photographs
http://www.highsider.com/textlager/japan_textlager/Nagai.htm
http://www.highsider.com/textlager/japan_textlager/Nagai_95_01.htm
http://www.highsider.com/textlager/japan_textlager/Nagai_95_02.htm
http://www.highsider.com/textlager/japan_textlager/Nagai_95_03.htm

1965 births
1995 deaths
Sportspeople from Saitama Prefecture
Superbike World Championship riders
Japanese motorcycle racers
Motorcycle racers who died while racing
Sport deaths in the Netherlands